"Say Hello to the Angels" and "NYC" are two songs by American rock band Interpol. Both songs were released as a double A-side 7" single on April 14, 2003, acting as the third single from their debut studio album, Turn on the Bright Lights (2002). The single peaked at number 65 on the UK Singles Chart.

"NYC" music video
A music video for "NYC" was produced, directed by Doug Aitken. It features the band in a montage of pictures and designs as well as footage of a park at night.

Reception
"NYC" has been included on several best-of lists. Consequence of Sound ranked it at number 46 on their Best Singles of the 2000s list. Pitchfork ranked it at 140 on their Top 500 Tracks of the 2000s list. Slant Magazine rated it at number 219 on their Best Singles of the Aughts list. Electronic musician Moby placed "NYC" as his 8th favorite track of the decade.

Track listing
7" vinyl (OLE582-7):
 "Say Hello to the Angels" – 4:28
 "NYC" – 4:21

CD (OLE582-2):
 "Say Hello to the Angels" – 4:28
 "NYC" – 4:21
 "NYC" (Demo) – 4:28

Charts

References

External links

Interpol (band) songs
2003 singles
2002 songs
Songs written by Carlos Dengler
Songs written by Paul Banks (American musician)
Songs written by Sam Fogarino
Songs written by Daniel Kessler (guitarist)
Song recordings produced by Gareth Jones
Matador Records singles
Songs about New York City